Sačurov is a village and municipality in Vranov nad Topľou District in the Prešov Region of eastern Slovakia.

History
In historical records the village was first mentioned in 1402.

Geography
The municipality lies at an elevation of 129 metres (423 ft) and covers an area of 21.178 km² (8.177 mi²). It has a population of about 2011.

External links
 
 
http://www.statistics.sk/mosmis/eng/run.html

Villages and municipalities in Vranov nad Topľou District